Ethanesulfonic acid (esylic acid) is a sulfonic acid with the chemical formula CH3CH2SO3H. The conjugate base is known as ethanesulfonate or, when used in pharmaceutical formulations, as esilate. It is a colorless liquid.

References

External links 
 Ye YK, Stringham RW (2006), The effect of acidic and basic additives on the enantioseparation of basic drugs using polysaccharide-based chiral stationary phases. Chirality 18, 519–530. (PubMed:16676332)
 National Center for Biotechnology Information (2005), Ethanesulfonic acid, PubChem Compound Database; CID=11668, (accessed December 23, 2016)
 https://www.scbt.com/scbt/product/ethanesulfonic-acid-594-45-6
 http://www.chemicalbook.com/productmsdsdetailcb5173859_en.htm

Sulfonic acids